Damon Blake Jackson (born August 8, 1988) is an American professional mixed martial artist currently competing in the Featherweight 
Ultimate Fighting Championship.  A professional since 2012, Jackson competed for Bellator MMA and King of the Cage and he was the former Legacy Fighting Alliance Interim Featherweight Champion.

Background
Born in Oklahoma, Jackson began wrestling from a young age and was talented. In high school, Jackson also competed in baseball and ran cross-country and track. Jackson was a state runner-up before continuing his career at Missouri Valley College where he was an All-American and had a fifth-place finish at the national tournament in 2012. Shortly after, Jackson began pursuing mixed martial arts.

Mixed martial arts career

Early career
Jackson held an amateur MMA record of 6-1 before making his professional debut September 2012, winning via TKO in the first round. He would go on to win his next two bouts, both via submission.

Bellator MMA
Jackson debuted for Bellator on January 24, 2013 at Bellator 86 against Zac Church. Jackson won the fight via rear-naked choke submission in the second round.

On June 19, 2013, Jackson defeated Keith Miner via TKO due to strikes in the first round at Bellator 96, improving his record to 6–0.

Legacy Fighting Championship
In October 2013, Jackson fought and defeated Javier Obregon by submission in the second round at Legacy FC 24.

Jackson would win his next bout via rear-naked choke submission at Legacy FC 28 against Hunter Tucker on February 21, 2014.

Jackson then faced WEC and UFC veteran Leonard Garcia for the Legacy FC featherweight championship at Legacy FC 33 on July 18, 2014. Jackson won the fight via submission in the first round.

Ultimate Fighting Championship
Stepping in as a late replacement for an injured Justin Edwards, Jackson faced Yancy Medeiros at UFC 177 on August 30, 2014. Jackson lost the fight via submission in the second round, suffering his first loss of his career.

Jackson faced Rony Jason on May 30, 2015 at UFC Fight Night 67. He lost the fight via triangle choke submission in the first round. On June 18, 2015, it was announced that Jason tested positive for hydrochlorothiazide, which is a banned diuretic, therefore his submission victory against Jackson was overturned and he received a nine-month suspension.

Jackson faced Levan Makashvili on January 30, 2016 at UFC on Fox 18. The bout was ruled a majority draw (28-28, 28-28, 29-27) after Makashvili was deducted one point in the third round due to an illegal knee and eye poke.

Legacy Fighting Alliance/PFL 
After going 6-1 fighting under the Legacy Fighting Alliance (LFA) banner, Jackson won the Featherweight Interim Legacy Fighting Alliance championship on August 10, 2018 against Nate Jennerman at Legacy Fighting Alliance 47 via knockout in round two.

He would sign with PFL to face Movlid Khaybulaev on May 23, 2019 at PFL 2, getting knocked out with a flying knee 10 seconds into the bout.

After the loss, Jackson returned to the LFA at LFA 83, submitting Mauro Chaulet in the first round via rear-naked choke.

Return to UFC
Jackson returned to UFC to face Mirsad Bektić, replacing Luiz Eduardo Garagorri on September 19, 2020 at UFC Fight Night 178.  He won the fight via a submission in round three. This win earned him a Performance of the Night bonus.

Jackson faced Ilia Topuria on December 5, 2020 at UFC on ESPN 19. He lost the fight via knockout in round one.

Jackson was scheduled to face T.J. Laramie on May 1, 2021 at UFC Fight Night 188. However in late March, Laramie pulled out of the fight for undisclosed reasons,  and he was replaced by Luke Sanders

Jackson faced Charles Rosa on October 9, 2021 at UFC Fight Night 194. He won the fight via unanimous decision.

Jackson was scheduled to face Joshua Culibao on March 12, 2022 UFC Fight Night 203. However, Culibao was pulled from the event for undisclosed reasons and he was replaced by Kamuela Kirk. Jackson won the fight via an arm triangle submission in round two.

Jackson was scheduled to face Darrick Minner on June 4, 2022 at UFC Fight Night 207. However, for undisclosed reasons, Minner was pulled from the event and he was replaced by newcomer Daniel Argueta. Jackson won the bout via unanimous decision.

Jackson faced Pat Sabatini on September 17, 2022 at UFC Fight Night 210. He won the fight via technical knockout in round one.  This fight earned him the Performance of the Night award.

Jackson faced Dan Ige January 14, 2023, at UFC Fight Night 217. He lost the fight via knockout in the second round.

Personal life
Jackson is married and has four daughters.

Championships and accomplishments

Mixed martial arts
Ultimate Fighting Championship
Performance of the Night (Two times) 
Legacy Fighting Championship
Legacy FC Featherweight Championship
Legacy Fighting Alliance
Interim LFA Featherweight Championship
MMAjunkie.com
2020 September Submission of the Month

Mixed martial arts record

|-
|Loss
|align=center|22–5–1 (1)
|Dan Ige
|KO (punch)
|UFC Fight Night: Strickland vs. Imavov
|
|align=center|2
|align=center|4:13
|Las Vegas, Nevada, United States
|
|-
|Win
|align=center|22–4–1 (1)
|Pat Sabatini
|TKO (punches)
|UFC Fight Night: Sandhagen vs. Song 
|
|align=center|1
|align=center|1:09
|Las Vegas, Nevada, United States
|
|-
|Win
|align=center|21–4–1 (1)
|Daniel Argueta
|Decision (unanimous)
|UFC Fight Night: Volkov vs. Rozenstruik
|
|align=center|3
|align=center|5:00
|Las Vegas, Nevada, United States
|
|-
|Win
|align=center|20–4–1 (1)
|Kamuela Kirk
|Submission (arm-triangle choke)
|UFC Fight Night: Santos vs. Ankalaev
|
|align=center|2
|align=center|4:42
|Las Vegas, Nevada, United States
|
|-
|Win
|align=center|19–4–1 (1)
|Charles Rosa
|Decision (unanimous)
|UFC Fight Night: Dern vs. Rodriguez
|
|align=center|3
|align=center|5:00
|Las Vegas, Nevada, United States
|
|-
| Loss
|align=center|18–4–1 (1)
|Ilia Topuria
|KO (punch)
|UFC on ESPN: Hermansson vs. Vettori
|
|align=center|1
|align=center|2:38
|Las Vegas, Nevada, United States
|
|-
| Win 
| align=center|18–3–1 (1)
| Mirsad Bektić
| Submission (guillotine choke)
| UFC Fight Night: Covington vs. Woodley
| 
| align=center| 3
| align=center| 1:21
| Las Vegas, Nevada, United States
|
|-
| Win 
| align=center|17–3–1 (1)
| Mauro Chaulet
| Submission (rear-naked choke)
| LFA 83
| 
| align=center| 1
| align=center| 2:11
| Dallas, Texas, United States
|
|-
| Loss
| align=center|16–3–1 (1)
| Movlid Khaybulaev
| KO (flying knee)
| PFL 2
| 
| align=center| 1
| align=center| 0:10
| Uniondale, New York, United States
| 
|-
| Win 
| align=center|16–2–1 (1)
| Nate Jennerman
| KO (punch)
| LFA 47
| 
| align=center| 2
| align=center| 0:33
| Dallas, Texas, United States
|
|-
| Win 
| align=center|15–2–1 (1)
| Jeremy Spoon
| Submission (rear-naked choke)
| LFA 40
| 
| align=center| 2
| align=center| 3:59
| Dallas, Texas, United States
|
|-
|Win
|align=center|14–2–1 (1)
|Chris Pecero
|Technical Submission (arm-triangle choke)
|LFA 33
|
|align=center|1
|align=center|0:38
|Dallas, Texas, United States
|
|-
|Win
|align=center|13–2–1 (1)
|Luis Luna
|Submission (rear-naked choke)
|LFA 28
|
|align=center|1
|align=center|4:58
|Dallas, Texas, United States
|
|-
|Win
|align=center|12–2–1 (1)
|Eliazar Rodriguez
|Submission (rear-naked choke)
|LFA 16
|
|align=center|1
|align=center|3:49
|Dallas, Texas, United States
|
|-
|Loss
|align=center|11–2–1 (1)
|Kevin Aguilar
|KO (punch)
|LFA 4
|
|align=center|3
|align=center|4:05
|Bossier City, Louisiana, United States
|
|-
|Win
|align=center|11–1–1 (1)
|Charles Cheek III
|Submission (rear-naked choke)
|LFA 1
|
|align=center|2
|align=center|1:24
|Dallas, Texas, United States
|
|-
|Win
|align=center| (1)
|Levi Mowles
|Decision (unanimous)
|Legacy FC 61
|
|align=center|3
|align=center|5:00
|Dallas, Texas, United States
|
|-
|Draw
|align=center|9–1–1 (1)
|Levan Makashvili
|Draw (majority)
|UFC on Fox: Johnson vs. Bader
|
|align=center|3
|align=center|5:00
|Newark, New Jersey, United States
|
|-
|NC
|align=center|9–1 (1)
|Rony Jason
|NC (overturned)
|UFC Fight Night: Condit vs. Alves
|
|align=center|1
|align=center|3:31
|Goiânia, Brazil
|
|-
|Loss
|align=center|9–1
|Yancy Medeiros
|Submission (reverse bulldog choke)
|UFC 177
|
|align=center|2
|align=center|1:54
|Sacramento, California, United States
|
|-
|Win
|align=center|9–0
|Leonard Garcia
|Submission (arm-triangle choke)
|Legacy FC 33
|
|align=center|1
|align=center|1:32
|Allen, Texas, United States
|
|-
|Win
|align=center|8–0
|Hunter Tucker
|Submission (rear-naked choke)
|Legacy FC 28
|
|align=center|2
|align=center|3:24
|Arlington, Texas, United States
|
|-
|Win
|align=center|7–0
|Javier Obregon
|Submission (arm-triangle choke)
|Legacy FC 24
|
|align=center|2
|align=center|4:12
|Dallas, Texas, United States
|
|-
|Win
|align=center|6–0
|Keith Miner
|TKO (punches)
|Bellator 96
|
|align=center|1
|align=center|2:00
|Thackerville, Oklahoma, United States
|
|-
|Win
|align=center|5–0
|Anselmo Luna
|Submission (armbar)
|24/7 Entertainment 9: Enemy of the State
|
|align=center|2
|align=center|1:15
|Odessa, Texas, United States
|
|-
|Win
|align=center|4–0
|Zac Church
|Submission (rear-naked choke)
|Bellator 86
|
|align=center|2
|align=center|2:43
|Thackerville, Oklahoma, United States
|
|-
|Win
|align=center|3–0
|Zac Church
|Submission
|KOTC: Unification
|
|align=center|2
|align=center|3:19
|Tulsa, Oklahoma, United States
|
|-
|Win
|align=center|2–0
|Shelby Graham
|Submission (rear-naked choke)
|Tommy Tran Promotions
|
|align=center|1
|align=center|4:43
|Branson, Missouri, United States
|
|-
|Win
|align=center|1–0
|Jacob Salyer
|TKO (punches)
|War Sports 1
|
|align=center|1
|align=center|2:23
|Springfield, Missouri, United States
|

See also
 List of current UFC fighters
 List of male mixed martial artists

References

External links
 
 

Living people
1988 births
American male mixed martial artists
Featherweight mixed martial artists
Lightweight mixed martial artists
Mixed martial artists utilizing collegiate wrestling
Mixed martial artists utilizing Brazilian jiu-jitsu
Ultimate Fighting Championship male fighters
American male sport wrestlers
Amateur wrestlers
American practitioners of Brazilian jiu-jitsu